Patrick Revelli (born 22 June 1951 in Mimet, Bouches-du-Rhône) is a French former professional football striker and brother of the footballer Hervé Revelli.

Honours
Saint-Étienne
Ligue 1: 1969–70, 1973–74, 1974–75, 1975–76
Coupe de France: 1973–74, 1974–75, 1976–77
European Cup runner-up: 1975–76

References

External links
 

1951 births
Living people
Sportspeople from Bouches-du-Rhône
French footballers
France international footballers
AS Saint-Étienne players
FC Sochaux-Montbéliard players
AS Cannes players
Ligue 1 players
Association football forwards
Footballers from Provence-Alpes-Côte d'Azur